Idiotypa is a genus of wasps belonging to the family Diapriidae.

The genus has almost cosmopolitan distribution.

Species:

Idiotypa marii 
Idiotypa maritima 
Idiotypa nigriceps 
Idiotypa pallida 
Idiotypa rufiventris

References

Diapriidae
Hymenoptera genera